Firgrove may refer to: 

Firgrove, Cape Town
Firgrove, County Tipperary